Amuda Subdistrict  is a subdistrict of Qamishli District in northeastern al-Hasakah Governorate, northeastern Syria. Administrative centre is the town Amuda.

At the 2004 census, the subdistrict had a population of 56,101.

Cities, towns and villages

References 

Qamishli District
Amuda